A baler is a piece of farm machinery. Baler may also refer to:

 Baler, Aurora, a municipality in Aurora, Philippines
 Baler (film), a 2008 film
 Baler, or Baler shell, a sea snail in the genus Melo

See also
 
 
 Bailer